The Weidas, also called the Weidasserbach, is a roughly eleven-kilometre-long, orographically right-hand tributary of the Selz in the German region of Rhenish Hesse.

Course 
The Weidas rises near Freimersheim and empties into the Rhine tributary of the Selz near Framersheim from the southwest. It flows in sequence through Wahlheim, Kettenheim, Dautenheim and Gau-Heppenheim.

Tributaries 
 Aufspring (left), south of Freimersheim, 
 Freimersheimer Bach (Flutgraben) (left), north of Freimersheim, 
 Esselborn (Esselborner Bach) (right), near the Hessensteigermühle mill, 
 Gau-Heppenheimerbach (right), northeast of the  mill,

See also 
List of rivers of Rhineland-Palatinate

References 

Rivers of Rhineland-Palatinate
Rhenish Hesse
Rivers of Germany